is a 2012 Japanese yakuza film directed by Takeshi Kitano, starring Kitano (a.k.a. "Beat Takeshi"), Toshiyuki Nishida, and Tomokazu Miura. It is a sequel to Kitano's 2010 film Outrage and is followed by the 2017 film Outrage Coda.

Plot summary
Five years have passed since the events of Outrage. Otomo, former Yakuza of the Sanno-kai crime syndicate, is presumed dead after being stabbed in prison by Kimura, whose clan Otomo helped destroy. Sekiuchi, chairman of the Sanno-Kai, was assassinated and succeeded by his underboss Kato, who has completely overhauled the syndicate to involve more legitimate businesses and build influence among high-ranking government officials, overseen by Ishihara, Otomo's treasurer and betrayer. However, Kato's emphasis on a system of modernization and profit-based promotion offends and concerns the more senior bosses, who are continually passed over in favor of younger, more profitable members and fear becoming obsolete.

The murder of an anti-corruption cop unnerves his colleagues, who know he was investigating corruption on the part of a Land Minister in league with the Sanno-kai. The anti-corruption department decides the Sanno-kai has become dangerously powerful and must be dismantled. To that end, they call in detective Kataoka, whose well-known ties among the yakuza allowed him to orchestrate much of the events of the first film. Corrupt and self-serving, Kataoka decides to instigate a war between the Sanno-Kai and the Hanabishi-kai from western Japan, in the hopes they will destroy each other. He convinces Tomita, one of the most senior and vocally resentful Sanno-kai bosses, to meet with Fuse, chairman of the Osaka branch of the Hanabishi-kai, about forcing Kato to retire. Fuse, concerned Tomita lacks the support needed to mount a takeover, reports him to Kato, who kills him as a lesson to other dissenters.

Kataoka turns to Otomo, whose death was just a rumor spread by Kataoka; he has spent the last five years in a maximum security prison. Kimura, his nemesis, has been released and struggles to adjust to civilian life as the owner of a batting cage. Kataoka has Otomo's sentence commuted and secures his early parole, while informing Kato and Ishihara he is still alive. A paranoid Ishihara hires assassins to kill Otomo, while Kataoka has him meet with Kimura. Time has caused the animosity between the two to become remorse, and Kimura expresses interest in joining forces to get revenge on those who betrayed them. Otomo knows they are being manipulated by Kataoka and wants no part of it. He is contacted by a childhood friend, Chang Dae-Sung, who is now an underworld fixer for gangs in both Japan and Korea and offers him a place in his employment; Otomo promises to consider it. When one of Ishihara's assassins nearly kills him, however, Otomo realizes he will never be left alone and agrees to partner with Kimura.

With the tacit approval of the Hanabishi-kai, Otomo and Kimura carry out a ruthless and bloody rampage through the ranks of the Sanno-kai. Kato's inability to stop the attacks causes increasing dissent in his syndicate, and the senior bosses are further manipulated by the Hanabishi-kai. Fuse also reveals he knows the truth about Sekiuchi's murder, using it as leverage. Kimura captures Ishihara, whom Otomo ties to a chair to be beaten to death by a pitching machine. Eventually all but a few of the Sanno-Kai bosses demand that Kato retire. Pressured by Fuse, he makes a public statement to the police taking responsibility for the war and Sekiuchi's murder, which is an enormous boost to Kataoka's career. Kimura decides to make a pact with Fuse, but Otomo, warned by Chang that both syndicates deem the two of them expendable, declares himself finished with the war and leaves. Kato, reduced to a mere civilian, is personally assassinated by Otomo at a pachinko parlor. The Sanno-Kai, decimated by the war, is absorbed into the Hanabishi-kai, making it almost omnipotent in central Japan.

Chang's warning proves to be true as Kimura is killed by Hanabishi-kai hitmen, after a police raid led by Kataoka leaves him defenseless. The Hanabishi-kai and Sanno-kai bosses gather at his funeral service, observed by Kataoka. Otomo arrives, intending to pay his respects; Kataoka, knowing both clans want Otomo dead, gives him a gun. But by now Otomo knows the war was entirely his doing, and shoots him.

Cast

 Takeshi Kitano (Beat Takeshi) as Otomo
 Tomokazu Miura as Kato
 Ryo Kase as Ishihara
 Fumiyo Kohinata as Detective Kataoka
 Yutaka Matsushige as Detective Shigeta
 Toshiyuki Nishida as Nishino
 Sansei Shiomi as Nakata
 Shigeru Kōyama as Fuse
 Katsunori Takahashi as Jo
 Akira Nakao as Tomita
 Tetsushi Tanaka as Funaki
 Ken Mitsuishi as Gomi
 Tatsuo Nadaka as Shiroyama
 Shun Sugata as Okamoto
 Hideo Nakano as Kimura
 Hirofumi Arai as Ono
 Kenta Kiritani as Shima
 Tokio Kaneda as Chang Dae-Sung (Mr. Chang), Korean fixer
 Hakuryu as Mr. Chang's bodyguard

Release
Beyond Outrage was screened in competition at the 69th Venice International Film Festival.

Soundtrack
Kitano returned to Keiichi Suzuki, the same Japanese composer he had used for the original Outrage film, for the complete sequel soundtrack, and previously Kitano had collaborated with him for the complete soundtrack to his Zatoichi film. This complete soundtrack for Beyond Outrage was their third film collaboration.

Reception
Gabe Toro of IndieWire gave Beyond Outrage an "A−" rating. Justin Chang of Variety described the film as "a slow-motion deathtrap in which the wall-to-wall chatter feels like a joyless, too-leisurely distraction from the inevitable bloodletting". Meanwhile, he commented that Otomo (Beat Takeshi) is "the most memorable figure here, a demon of death shown to brook no nonsense in the film's blunt, perfect final scene". Lee Marshall of Screen International said: "Out-and-out shouting matches between supposedly composed clan members are another forte of Outrage Beyond – a film that always has humour bubbling just underneath its hard-boiled surface".

Kinema Junpo placed Beyond Outrage at number 3 in their "10 Best Japanese Films of 2012", while it was ranked at number 36 on the Film Comment'''s "50 Best Undistributed Films of 2012".

The film became a box office success. As of 30 June 2013, Box Office Mojo reported a total revenue for Outrage approaching USD ten million with USD 8,383,891 in the total worldwide lifetime box office. Beyond Outrage had receipts more than twice as high, at USD 16,995,152.

Sequel

A sequel, Outrage Coda, the final installment of Outrage'' trilogy, was released in October 2017. Takeshi Kitano directed and starred in the film.

References

External links
  
 

2012 films
Films directed by Takeshi Kitano
Yakuza films
Warner Bros. films
2010s Japanese films
2010s Japanese-language films